Gars am Kamp is a market town at the Kamp river (Kamptal) in the district of Horn, region Waldviertel in the Austrian state Lower Austria with 3,542 inhabitants (2016).

History
Gars was between 1075 - 1095, during the reign of the House of Babenberg, a former capital of ancient Austria.

In the 19th and 20th centuries, Gars was a traditional summer resort (Sommerfrische). At the end of the 20th century, the climatic health resort (Luftkurort) of Gars experienced another boom thanks to Willi Dungl's health tourism.

Structure
The municipality includes the following 13 localities:
Buchberg am Kamp, Etzmannsdorf am Kamp, Gars am Kamp, Kamegg, Kotzendorf, Loibersdorf, Maiersch, Nonndorf bei Gars, Tautendorf, Thunau am Kamp, Wanzenau, Wolfshof, Zitternberg

Population

International relations

Twin towns — Sister cities
Gars am Kamp is twinned with the following cities:
 Gars am Inn, Germany

Politics
 Dialog im Kamptal, non-partisan platform

Notable people (selection)
 Willi Dungl, health expert
 Falco, singer
 Richard Gach, architect
 Helmuth Gräff, artist, poet 
 Matthias Laurenz Gräff, artist,  historian, political activist
 Werner Groiß, politician, entrepreneur
 Leopold II, Margrave of Austria
 Leopold III, Margrave of Austria, born in Gars
 Marianne Mendt, singer, actress
 Andrea Scherney, paralympic athlete
 Karl Sigmund, mathematician
 Franz von Suppé, composer
 Josef Wiesinger, politician

References

External links 

Cities and towns in Horn District